East Brook may refer to:

 East Brook (Read Creek), New York, U.S.
 East Brook (West Branch Delaware River tributary), New York, U.S.